The 1984 Mid-American Conference men's basketball tournament took place March 8–10, 1984, at the Rockford MetroCentre in Rockford, Illinois. Miami (OH) defeated , 42–40 in the championship game, to win its second MAC Tournament title.

The Redskins earned an automatic bid to the 1984 NCAA tournament as No. 9 seed in the West region. In the round of 48, Ball State was defeated by SMU 83–69.

Format
Only the top seven in the regular season conference standings participated, with the bottom three teams left out. Miami received a bye to the semifinal round.

Bracket

References

1989
Tournament
MAC men's basketball tournament
MAC men's basketball tournament